The Mardijker people refers to an ethnic community in the Dutch East Indies (present-day Indonesia) made up of descendants of freed slaves. They could be found at all major trading posts in the East Indies. They were mostly Christian, of various ethnicity from conquered Portuguese and Spanish territories, and some with European ancestry. They spoke a Portuguese patois, which has influenced the modern Indonesian language.

Origin 
The ancestors of the Mardijkers had been slaves of the Portuguese in India, Africa and Malay Peninsula, and were brought to Indonesia by the Dutch East India Company (VOC), especially after the 1641 Dutch conquest of Malacca, whereby Portuguese speakers in the city were taken as captive. Some were also Christian slaves captured by Moro raiders from the Philippines and sold in slave markets in Batavia during the height of the Spanish–Moro conflict and the Sulu Sea piracy. In the Spanish Philippines, they were called "Mardica", as recorded in the Murillo Velarde Map.

The term Mardijker is a Dutch corruption of the Malay word Merdeka, which originates from the Sanskrit Maharddhika meaning "rich, prosperous and powerful". In the Malay archipelago, this term had acquired the meaning of a freed slave, and now means "independent".

The Mardijkers mostly clung to their Catholic faith and continued to attend Batavia's Portuguese church, although many were eventually baptised by the Dutch Reformed Church. They were legally recognized by the VOC as a separate ethnic group, and kept themselves apart from the native Javanese.

During the VOC era there was already considerable inter-marriage with the Indos in pre-colonial history, who were often also of Portuguese descent. During the colonial era the Mardijkers eventually assimilated completely into the Eurasian Indo community and were no longer registered as a separate ethnic group.

Transition 
Between the 18th and 19th centuries, the Mardijkers exchanged their Portuguese-based creole for Betawi language.  

A part of Jakarta is called "Kampung Tugu" an area where Mardijker people had been allowed to settle for after their freedom, the neighborhood retains its Portuguese distinctiveness. Historically these people also settled in Old Batavia's Roa Malacca district near Kali besar, however little historic buildings remain of what had been the historic quarter.

Common Mardijker family names are De Fretes, Ferrera, De Mello, Gomes, Gonsalvo, Cordero, De Dias, De Costa, Soares, Rodrigo, De Pinto, Perreira, and De Silva. Some Mardijker families also took Dutch names such as Willems, Michiels, Bastiaans, Pieters, Jansz, Fransz, and Davidts.

When the Indonesians fought for independence from the Dutch they used the slogan Merdeka ("freedom"), which has the same root with Mardijker. This word had considerable political significance also in Malaysia and Singapore. The term Mardijkers is also used for the so-called Belanda Hitam, soldiers recruited in the Dutch Gold Coast who served in the Dutch East Indies Army and gained their freedom afterward.

See also

Kampung Tugu
Mardijker Creole language
African Indonesians
Betawi people
Belanda Hitam
Indian Indonesians
Indo people
Klingalese
Portuguese Indonesians

References

Footnotes

Bibliography 

 
 

Ethnic groups in Indonesia
African diaspora in Indonesia
Indian diaspora in Indonesia
Indonesian people of Portuguese descent
Portuguese diaspora in Asia